Nazmi Avluca (born November 14, 1976, in Kargı, Çorum Province), is a Turkish sports wrestler, who has won several titles at international competitions including four European and two FILA Wrestling World Championships in the Men's Greco-Roman category.

Wrestling career 
Nazmi Avluca took also part at the 1996 and 2000 Olympics without success, and then finally achieved Olympic success with a bronze medal in 2008 in Beijing. He also competed at the 2012 Summer Olympics.  Currently, he is an active member of the Emlakspor club in Istanbul.

Born in the Central Anatolian town Kargı of Çorum Province, he began early sport wrestling at the Wrestling Training Center in Bolu in 1987. Admitted to the national Greco-Roman team in 1991, he won his first international gold in the 60 kg division at the 1992 World Cadets Championships held in Istanbul.

Nazmi Avluca was transferred to the German wrestling club 1. Luckenwalder SC in 2005, where undefeated, he helped his team become the German champions in 2006 for the first time in their club history. He returned home to join Şekerspor Club in Konya before the 2006 World Championships

Honors 
 "Best Wrestler of 2006 in Greco-Roman Style" awarded by the International Federation of Associated Wrestling Styles (FILA).

References

External links 
 

1975 births
Living people
People from Kargı
Olympic wrestlers of Turkey
Wrestlers at the 1996 Summer Olympics
Wrestlers at the 2000 Summer Olympics
Turkish male sport wrestlers
Wrestlers at the 2008 Summer Olympics
Olympic bronze medalists for Turkey
Olympic medalists in wrestling
Wrestlers at the 2012 Summer Olympics
Medalists at the 2008 Summer Olympics
European champions for Turkey
World Wrestling Championships medalists
European Wrestling Champions
20th-century Turkish people
21st-century Turkish people